Trafficking protein particle complex subunit 3 is a protein that in humans is encoded by the TRAPPC3 gene.

References

Further reading